Julia Behnke (born 28 March 1993) is a German handball player for Ferencvárosi TC and the German national team.

References

External links

German female handball players
1993 births
Living people
Sportspeople from Mannheim
Expatriate handball players
German expatriate sportspeople in Hungary
German expatriate sportspeople in Russia
Ferencvárosi TC players (women's handball)